Ragösen is a village and a former municipality in Wittenberg district in Saxony-Anhalt, Germany. Since 1 July 2009, it is part of the town Coswig.

Former municipalities in Saxony-Anhalt
Coswig, Saxony-Anhalt